Mike Waters (born 30 June 1967) is a South African politician, and former Member of Parliament for the opposition Democratic Alliance (DA), where he served as the Opposition's Deputy Chief Whip from 2014 to 2019. He  served as the Shadow Minister of Health from 2006 to 2012, and as the Shadow Minister of Social Development from 2012 to 2014.

Early life
Waters was born in the United Kingdom in 1967. He and his family migrated to South Africa in 1972. Waters attended Bedfordview High School before attaining a diploma in human resources from Technikon Witwatersrand. He joined the Democratic Party in 1989, and became president of the DP National Youth in 1994.

Political career
Waters began his professional political career on the Kempton Park town council, winning a landmark by-election against the National Party in 1997. He was elected to Parliament in 1999, and subsequently was appointed DA spokesperson on Child Abuse. In 2004 he became Social Development spokesperson. He succeeded Gareth Morgan as Shadow Health Minister in 2006, a position he held until 2012, when he was appointed as Shadow Minister of Social Development by the newly elected DA parliamentary leader, Lindiwe Mazibuko.

After he was re-elected to parliament in 2014, he was a candidate for deputy chief whip of the DA caucus. He defeated incumbent Sandy Kalyan in a vote that went 63 to 36. At the 2015 Democratic Alliance Federal Congress, Waters was elected as one of three federal chairpersons of the DA. Waters was a senior member of Ghaleb Cachalia's unsuccessful campaign to unseat John Moodey as the provincial leader of the DA in Gauteng in 2017. He was re-elected for a second term as a federal chairperson in 2018.

Following his re-election to parliament in 2019, he ran for re-election as deputy chief whip, but was defeated by Jacques Julius. He then refused to be appointed to the DA's shadow cabinet. In June 2019, James Selfe announced that he would be retiring as the chairperson of the DA's Federal Council. Waters subsequently declared that he was a candidate to replace him. He said that the party needed to return to its "core values" and that former party leader Helen Zille should be allowed back into the party's leadership. He received few votes and finished last in a vote on 20 October 2019, which Zille won.

In September 2020, John Moodey resigned from the party after he allegedly colluded with senior DA councillors in the Ekurhuleni Metropolitan Municipality to frame Waters in an alleged sex-for-jobs scandal. Waters accused Moodey of trying to "destroy" his reputation and political career. He also vowed legal action against him. Waters stood down as a federal chairperson at the DA's Federal Congress in November 2020.

On 19 February 2021, Waters resigned from parliament, saying that "being an MP has been the greatest honour of my life." According to close confidants, he had lately contemplated resigning and gave no official reason when he resigned. He thanked the DP, the DA, and the voters of Kempton Park and Edenvale for their support. In June 2021, Waters was appointed as the DA's Gauteng East Campaign Manager for the 2021 local government elections. He resigned from the post on 11 October after the DA decided to take down its controversial election posters in Phoenix, KwaZulu-Natal. Waters was in support of the message and criticised the party for its decision to backtrack on supporting the controversial posters. He said in his resignation letter that he was "shocked and horrified" by the  party's weakness.

Policy issues

AIDS policy
Waters has been a vocal critic of the African National Congress's health policies, particularly those of controversial former health minister Manto Tshabalala-Msimang.

Child abuse
As the DA's spokesperson on child abuse, Waters visited all 45 child protection units in South Africa during 2002. The following year he visited all 48 sexual offences units. He was vocally critical of the ruling ANC's decision to disband the amalgamated Family Violence, Child Protection and Sexual Offences units in 2006.

National Health Insurance
Waters has publicly criticised the ANC's proposed national health insurance scheme. He has labeled the plan anti-poor and irresponsible:

Personal life
Waters is openly gay.

References

External links
 Waters' profile at Whoswhosa.co.za
 Profile at Old Parliament website

Offices held 

Living people
Democratic Alliance (South Africa) politicians
1967 births
Gay politicians
South African people of Welsh descent
White South African people
Members of the National Assembly of South Africa
British emigrants to South Africa
People from Middlesbrough
South African LGBT politicians